Daniel Joseph Curley (June 16, 1869 – August 3, 1932) was an American prelate of the Roman Catholic Church. He served as Bishop of Syracuse from 1923 until his death in 1932.

Biography
Daniel Curley was born in New York City to Michael and Margaret (née Swan) Curley. He studied at St. Francis Xavier College and afterwards St. Joseph's Seminary in Troy, where he befriended Patrick Joseph Hayes (future Archbishop of New York and a cardinal). He furthered his studies at the Pontifical North American College in Rome, and was there ordained to the priesthood on May 19, 1894. 

Following his return to New York, he served as a curate at the Church of the Holy Name in Manhattan. He became secretary to Archbishop Michael Corrigan in 1901, and the founding pastor of Our Lady of Solace Church in The Bronx in 1902. In 1921 his name was suggested by Archbishop Patrick Hayes as an auxiliary bishop of New York.

On February 19, 1923, Curley was appointed the third Bishop of Syracuse by Pope Pius XI. He received his episcopal consecration on the following May 1 from Archbishop Hayes, with Bishops Edmund Gibbons and William Turner serving as co-consecrators, at St. Patrick's Cathedral. Edward Joseph Hanna, Archbishop of San Francisco, preached the sermon.

During his nine-year-long tenure, the Catholic population of the diocese increased from 173,200 to 201,152. He established a Society for the Propagation of the Faith, 28 parishes, 18 schools, Loretto Rest, and Lourdes Hospital. At his invitation, the Sisters of Perpetual Rosary opened the first home for cloistered nuns in Syracuse.

Among his final official acts was the approval of financing for a new parish in Lyncourt, New York, which parish, St. Daniels's, was subsequently named for him. Curley died from heart disease at age 63 in Syracuse, New York. He is buried in the crypt of the Cathedral of the Immaculate Conception.

References

1869 births
1932 deaths
Roman Catholic bishops of Syracuse
20th-century Roman Catholic bishops in the United States